Telewizja Polska S.A. (TVP), also known in English as Polish Television, is a state media corporation in Poland, founded in 1952. It is the oldest and largest Polish television network, although viewership has been declining in the 2010s.

Since 1993, the legal status of the broadcaster has been defined by the Broadcasting Act, according to which Telewizja Polska is obliged to implement "a public mission ... by offering ... various programmes and other services in the field of information, journalism, culture, entertainment, education and sport, characterized by pluralism, impartiality, balance and independence as well as innovation, high quality and integrity of the message." Since 2016, TVP has been described by critics as providing one-sided favorable coverage of the ruling Law and Justice party.

Timeline of Polish TV service

 1935: The PIT (Państwowy Instytut Telekomunikacyjny - National Telecommunications Institute) starts working together with Polish Radio on establishing the first television service.
 1937: Completion of the first black-and-white broadcasting station.
 1938: Experimental channel launched, regular programming scheduled for 1941.
 1939: All equipment destroyed by the German Army.
 1947: PIT resumes work on television broadcasting.
 1951: First Polish telecast after the Second World War.
 1952: Beginning of regular programming.
 1957: Broadcast of the first sports event; a boxing match Skra Warsaw – Gwardia Łódź
 1958: Newscast Dziennik Telewizyjny ("Journal") was founded.
 1970: TVP2 was founded.
 1971: Start of colour broadcasting (in SECAM).
 1989: Introduction of a teletext service.
 1989: Dziennik Telewizyjny was replaced by Wiadomości ("News").
 1992: Telewizja Polska Spółka Akcyjna comes into existence upon the separation of television and radio public broadcasting by an act of parliament.
 1992: TVP Polonia starts test transmissions.
 1993: Polskie Radio i Telewizja (Polish Radio and Television) joins the European Broadcasting Union as an active member (regrouping of OIRT and UER).
 1994: Beginning of the change over from SECAM to PAL for all channels except TVP1.
 1995: Change over from SECAM to PAL was completed as TVP1 moved to this colour standard.
 2003: Change of TVP logotype.
 2009: New main headquarters building opened in Warsaw.
 2013: Analogue terrestrial television was switched-off.
 2020: TVP eSzkoła,  and TVP Dokument were founded.
 2021:  was founded.
 2022:  was founded, replacing TVP eSzkoła.

International cooperation
In 2012, TVP signed an agreement with the BBC, under which they will work together on film and television productions.

The French-German TV liberal arts network ARTE cancelled a 15-year cooperation with TVP, when it learned in February 2009 that TVP's general director, Piotr Farfał, was a member of the League of Polish Families, which opposed Arte’s "philosophy based on intercultural exchange" and "the party that TVP's chairman is presently connected with does not share European values". It was again cancelled in January 2016 after an amendment of the media law in Poland, which caused fears of a lack of pluralism and independence of TVP.

Viewership
In September 2020, TVP's "Wiadomości" was the most popular news program in Poland, with an average of 2.66 million viewers a day.
In February 2021, TVP's "Wiadomości" was second most popular news program in Poland, with an average of 2.41 million viewers a day.

Logo history

TV channels

Unofficially announced plans to transfer these channels to free-to-air broadcasting.
 TVP Polonia, TVP Info and TVP Historia 2 are also available on DVB-T in Lithuania.
TVP World available on DTT in Poland (DVB-T2), Estonia (DVB-T), Lithuania (DVB-T), Austria (DVB-T2, Pay TV) and United Kingdom (DVB-T2, HbbTV).

Flagship channels
 TVP1: mostly news, current affairs, movies, dramas, children's and sports. Broadcasts 23.5 hours per day. Full HD introduced 1 June 2012.
 TVP2: mostly news, movies, comedy, soap operas, series, stand-up comedy, culture, sports and game shows. Broadcasts 23.5 hours per day. Full HD introduced 1 June 2012. 

 TVP3: region-focused channel, which airs local programmes (regional blocks broadcasts 6 hours per day), and acts as the umbrella label for local stations including:
 TVP3 Białystok in Białystok for Podlaskie region
 TVP3 Bydgoszcz in Bydgoszcz-Toruń for the Kuyavian-Pomeranian region
 TVP3 Gdańsk in Trójmiasto for the Pomerania region,
 TVP3 Gorzów Wielkopolski in Gorzów Wielkopolski for Lubusz region
 TVP3 Katowice in Katowice (Upper Silesian Metropolis) for Silesian region
 TVP3 Kielce in Kielce for Holy Cross region
 TVP3 Kraków for the Lesser Poland region
 TVP3 Lublin for the Lublin region
 TVP3 Łódź for the Łódź region
 TVP3 Olsztyn for Warmia-Masuria region
 TVP3 Opole for the Opole region
 TVP3 Poznań for the Greater Poland region
 TVP3 Rzeszów for the Subcarpathian region
 TVP3 Szczecin for the West Pomerania
 TVP3 Warszawa for Warsaw and the Masovia region. Full HD introduced 15 February 2022.
 TVP3 Wrocław for the Lower Silesia region

Thematic channels
 TVP Info: news channel. Broadcasts 24 hours per day. Full HD introduced 30 September 2016.
 TVP Sport: sport channel. Broadcasts 23,5 hours per day. Full HD introduced 12 January 2014.
 TVP ABC: Children's channel. Broadcasts 18 hours per day. Full HD introduced 28 March 2022.
 : teenager's channel broadcasts 18 hours per day. Start broadcast in Full HD from 20 December 2022.
 TVP HD: the best productions of TVP in HD. Broadcasts 23 hours per day. Start broadcast in Full HD from 6 August 2008.
 TVP Kultura: high-brow culture channel. Broadcasts 22-23 hours per day. Full HD introduced 23 October 2019.
 TVP Historia: focusing on history. Broadcasts 20,5 hours per day. Full HD introduced 27 February 2023.
 TVP Dokument: documentary movies channel. Broadcasts 23 hours per day. Start broadcast in Full HD from 19 November 2020.
 : focusing on science and nature. Broadcasts 21 hours per day. Start broadcast in Full HD from 3 October 2022.
 TVP Rozrywka: focusing on entertainment. Broadcasts 23 hours per day. Full HD introduced 23 February 2022.
 : focusing on series. Broadcasts 23 hours per day. Full HD introduced 27 February 2023.
 : focusing on programmes aimed at women. Broadcasts 22 hours per day. Start broadcast in Full HD from 8 March 2021.

Internet channels
 : children's channel broadcasts 18 hours per day.
 : focusing on history. Broadcasts 20 hours per day.
 : high-brow culture channel.
 TVP Parlament
 Jasna Góra TV

International channels
 TVP Polonia – retransmits selected TVP programming for the Polish diaspora (the so-called Polonia) in the US, Canada, Latin America, Australia and New Zealand, South Africa, Europe, and the Caucasus. Full HD introduced 1 September 2020.
 Belsat – channel in the Belarusian language presenting news and subject-specific programming for the people in Belarus. Broadcasts 19-21 hours per day, included international TV-programm "Vot Tak" and rebroadcasting of the Ukrainian TV-marathon "United News". Available on DTT in Lithuania (DVB-T) and Poland (HEVC, DVB-T2). Full HD introduced in spring 2022.
  – channel presenting news and programming for the Polish-speaking minority in the Vilnius region of Lithuania, available in DVB-T in this country. Broadcasts 22-23 hours per day. Full HD introduced 10 September 2021.
  – English-language channel for international audience. Start broadcast in Full HD from 18 November 2021.

Streaming platforms
 TVP VOD: the main streaming service with a paid subscription and premium content for subscribers. After the restart in October 2022, premieres produced specifically for this service began to appear. The list of linear TV-channels disappeared after the restart. Available on own portal (vod.tvp.pl) and any apps and devices.
 TVP GO: broadcast of linear TV-channels (Included Belsat and Pershyi kanal Suspilʹnoho. Except TVP HD, TVP Seriale and TVP Wilno) and content library. Available on HbbTV and mobile apps.
 TVP Stream: broadcast of selected TV-channels (TVP3, TVP Polonia, TVP Wilno, TVP World, TVP Info, Alfa TVP, Pershyi kanal Suspilʹnoho, TVP Kultura 2, TVP Historia 2, TVP ABC 2, Jasna Góra TV and TVP Parlament). Available on own portal (stream.tvp.pl).
 TVP Parlament: Broadcasts of parliamentary sessions and state events. Available on own portal (tvpparlament.pl) and TVP Stream.
 TVP Sport Stream: Broadcasts of sporting events not included in the linear TV-channel schedule. Available on own portal (sport.tvp.pl/transmisje) and mobile or smart-TV apps.

Upcoming channels 
 TVP 4K (regular broadcasting): Full-time Ultra HD channel. Currently only broadcasts during special sporting events.

Former channels, services and projects 
 TVP Regionalna (1994-2000): Regional network (first version).
 TVP3 (2000-2007): Regional network (first version).
 TVP Info (2007-2013): News channel and Regional network.
 TVP Regionalna (2013-2016): Regional network (relauch, second version). Replaced to TVP3 (second version).
 Poland IN (2018-2021): English-language online platform. Replaced to TVP World.
 TVP eSzkoła (2020-2022): educational channel during the pandemic.
 TVP eSzkoła Domowe Przedszkole (2020-2022): educational channel during the pandemic. Replaced to TVP ABC 2.
 Tylko Muzyka (1997-1998): First thematic channel from TVP.
 TVP Żagle (2013)
 iTVP (2005-2008): interactive channel.
 TVP Telewizja Naziemna (2020-2021)
 TVP Bieszczady (2014)
 TVP 25 lat wolności (2014) 
 TVP Festiwal Dwa Teatry Sopot 2014 (2014)
 TVP Regionalna śladami Jana Pawła 2 (2014)
 TVP Zdrowo i ze Smakiem (2014)
 TVP 4K (2018 , 2021 , 2022)

Controversies
Before 2015, the PiS (then opposition) often criticized TVP of siding with government (PO-PSL) or even compared it to communist propaganda In 2015, the government passed a law allowing it to directly appoint the head of TVP. Since then, TVP has displayed bias towards the Law and Justice (PiS) party (then government), and was compared by critics with propaganda of the former Communist regime. TVP has also faced criticism for its portrayal of LGBT people, the political opposition, Jews, and other groups as a shadowy conspiracy seeking to undermine Poland. In 2018, The Economist stated: "the [TVP] anchors... praise PiS slavishly while branding its critics treacherous crypto-communists.

In July 2016 Politico.eu criticized it for strong pro-government bias.

The press freedom organization Reporters Without Borders wrote in its 2019 assessment of Polish press freedom that "many blamed state-owned TV broadcaster TVP’s 'hate propaganda' for Gdansk mayor Pawel Adamowicz's murder in January 2019.". Ahead of the 2019 European parliament elections, TVP ran 105 segments of the election of which 68 of 69 focused on the ruling party were positive and all 33 about the opposition were negative, according to a study by the Society of Journalists. Polish political scientist and anti-racism activist Rafał Pankowski stated, "I am old enough to remember Communist-controlled television in the 1980s, and I can safely say that what we have now is cruder, more primitive, and more aggressive than anything that was broadcast at that time."This contrasts with the testimonies that killer of Pawel Adamowicz was reading Gazeta Wyborcza, Dziennik Bałtycki, Polityka and Wprost and watched TVN, and Polsat but not TVP

TVP was heavily criticized in the run-up to the 2020 Polish presidential election, being described as the "mouthpiece" of the government and as "peddl[ing] government hate speech" by the organization Reporters Without Borders. The state television broadcast a segment of Wiadomości called Trzaskowski spełni żydowskie żądania? ("Will Trzaskowski meet Jewish demands?") regarding the Civic Platform candidate Rafał Trzaskowski. A complaint was made by the American Jewish Committee, Union of Jewish Religious Communities, the Chief Rabbi of Poland, to the Polish  regarding antisemitism in the program. The Council concluded not only were anti-semitic statements made in the show, it did not uphold journalistic standards: Wiadomości "turned into an instrument of propaganda of one of the candidates in this election".

In 2020, the station was ordered to retract a documentary, Inwazja, released just before the 2019 elections. Comparing the LGBT movement unfavorably to the Swedish Deluge and Communism, the documentary claimed that there is an "LGBT invasion" of Poland and that LGBT organizations have the goal of legalizing pedophilia. It was found to defame the Campaign Against Homophobia organization. Ombudsman Adam Bodnar stated, "The material not only reproduces stereotypes and heightens social hatred towards LGBT people, but also manipulates facts."

According to Timothy Garton Ash, "the broadcaster has descended into the paranoid world of the far right, where spotless, heroic, perpetually misunderstood Poles are being conspired against by dark, international German-Jewish-LGBT-plutocratic forces meeting secretly in Swiss chateaux." TVP president Jacek Kurski rejected the contention that the organization violated broadcasting law, and conservative media commentator and former TVP employee Jacek Karnowski says the station "deserves recognition" for its "consistent promotion of patriotism and pro-state thinking".

See also
 Polskie Radio
 Radiokomitet
 Krajowa Rada Radiofonii i Telewizji

References

External links

 
  
 Digitaltvnews.net, Poland's TVP Launches Free-To-Air Satellite Platform.

 
Television networks in Poland
Publicly funded broadcasters
European Broadcasting Union members
Eastern Bloc mass media
Mass media in Poland
Mass media companies established in 1952
Television channels and stations established in 1952
1952 establishments in Poland